Trond Einar Moen Pedersli  (born 21 February 1994) is a Norwegian orienteering competitor. He was born in Trondheim. At the 2018 European Orienteering Championships in Cadempino he won a bronze medal in the sprint relay with the Norwegian team. He competed at the 2018 World Orienteering Championships in Latvia, where he qualified for the sprint final, placing 23rd. 

As a track athlete representing Strindheim IL, he placed 8th in 5000 metres at the 2017 Norwegian Championships.

References

Norwegian orienteers
Male orienteers
1994 births
Living people
Sportspeople from Trondheim
20th-century Norwegian people
21st-century Norwegian people